Spilosoma tenuivena is a moth in the family Erebidae. It was described by Sergius G. Kiriakoff in 1965. It is found in the Democratic Republic of the Congo.

References

Moths described in 1965
tenuivena
Endemic fauna of the Democratic Republic of the Congo